Once Upon a Time in the West is a Western film starring Henry Fonda and Charles Bronson. 

Once Upon a Time in the West may also refer to:

 Once Upon a Time in the West (soundtrack), the soundtrack to the film
 Once Upon a Time in the West (album), the second studio album by English indie rock band Hard-Fi
 "Once Upon a Time in the West", a Dire Straits song on the album Communiqué